Simon Jacques Rochard (28 December 1788 – 10 June 1872) was a painter of portrait miniatures in France, England and Brussels in the first half of the  nineteenth century.

He was born in Paris to René Rochard and Marie Madeleine Talon.  He showed early talent and, after his father died, helped support his mother and eleven siblings by drawing portraits. Rochard studied under Étienne Aubry and at the École des Beaux-Arts.  He also studied miniature-painting from Emilie Bounieu (daughter of Michel Honoré Bounieu). At only twenty he painted a portrait of the Empress Joséphine for Napoleon and later other portraits of the imperial family.

After Napoleon's return from Elba in 1815, he was drafted into the army but deserted and went to Brussels. There he received commissions to paint miniatures including at least one of the Duke of Wellington leader of the forces opposing Napoleon.  Shortly after he moved to London and became very popular, painting numerous miniatures of members of the upper class such as Princess Charlotte.  He exhibited mostly at the Royal Academy of Arts from 1816 to 1845.

In 1846, he moved to Brussels where he exhibited at the Salon there until 1869.  He also exhibited at the Paris Salon in 1852 and the International Exposition of 1867 in Paris. He died in 1872.

Marriage and family 
His first marriage to Henriette Petitjean ended in a separation but left Rochard with a daughter, Eugenie, born in 1814,  who married an English officer. At the age of 80 (circa 1868) he married Henriette Pilton, by whom he had one son.  (However his son, Jean Simon Rochard, was apparently born before 1856.)

His younger brother, François Theodore Rochard (1798–1857),  joined him  in London around 1820.  He was also a popular portrait painter specializing in miniatures and in water colors and won two silver medals from the new Society of British Artists in 1823. He retired after his marriage in 1850 and died on 31 October 1857 in London.

Gallery of Rochard Paintings
Most of these are miniatures.

External links
, a portrait by François Theodore Rochard, for Heath's Book of Beauty, 1836, engraved by H.Cook, with illustrative verse by Letitia Elizabeth Landon.
, by François Theodore Rochard, engraved by T. Hollis for The Cabinet of Modern Art, 1837, with a poetical illustration by Letitia Elizabeth Landon
 by François Theodore Rochard, engraved by Henry Cook for Heath's Book of Beauty, 1838, with a poetical illustration by Letitia Elizabeth Landon.

References 

1788 births
1872 deaths
19th-century French painters
Painters from Paris
Portrait miniaturists
École des Beaux-Arts alumni
French male painters
19th-century French male artists